Weifang North railway station (Chinese: 潍坊北站) is a railway station in Hanting District, Weifang, Shandong, China. The station is on the northern edge of the urban area. The more central Weifang railway station is on the Qingdao–Jinan railway and the Qingdao–Jinan passenger railway.

The station will become an interchange with the opening of the in 2020. The planned Second Beijing–Shanghai high-speed railway is also expected to pass through this station.

History
The station opened on 26 December 2018 along with the Jinan–Qingdao high-speed railway.

References

Railway stations in Shandong
Railway stations in China opened in 2018